State Highway 93 (abbreviated SH-93) is a state highway in the U.S. state of Oklahoma. SH-93 has no lettered spur routes.

Route description
SH-93 begins at US-70 between Hugo and the unincorporated community of Fallon. It runs north to Messer, where it turns more northeast and crosses Hugo Lake. It then runs west of Apple before crossing into Pushmataha County. It ends at State Highway 3 just west of Rattan.

Junction list

References

External links

SH-93 at Roadklahoma

093
Transportation in Choctaw County, Oklahoma
Transportation in Pushmataha County, Oklahoma